Petru Cărare (13 February 1935 – 27 May 2019) was a writer from Moldova.

Petru Cărare was born to Profir Cărare and Nadejda Duca. He was forbidden to publish in the 1970s. He translated works by Ivan Krylov, Samuil Marshak, Rasul Gamzatov, Sebastian Brant, Gianni Rodari, and François Villon.

Awards
 Laureat al Premiului Național (2000).
 Honorary citizen of Căușeni District

Works
 Parodii, Trandafir sălbatic (1965)
 Stele verzi (1967)
 Săgeți (1972)
 Săgeți
 Săgeți. Carul cu proști și alte poeme
 Vatra (1980)
Parodii şi epigrame (1981)
Versuri lirice și satirice, Rezonanțe (1985)
Penița și bărdița (1988)
Fulgere basarabene
Eu nu mă las de limba noastră, de limba noastră cea română (1997)
Leul n-are frigider
Pălăria gândurilor mele (2000)
Puncte de reper (2003)

Children's books
 Cale bună, Ionele (1962)
 Poiana veselă (1963)
 Ploaie cu soare (1964)
 Zodia musafirului (1970)
 Ionică Tropoțel (1978)
 Între patru ochi (1979)
 Urzicuțe (1979)
 Vacanța lui Tropoțel (1980)
 Broasca cea isteață
 Luminișuri (1983)
 Tropoțel ajunge primul (1985)
 Zurgălăi, Tropoțel și toți ceilalți (1987)
 Zâmbăreți și cucuieți (1990)
 În ajun de Anul Nou (1992)
 Umbreluța (1994)
 Un motan citea o carte (2002)

References

External links 
  ARHIVELE COMUNISMULUI Cenzura în comunism: urmările "Săgeţilor" lui Petru Cărare (1972)
  PETRU CĂRARE – DISIDENTUL INCONTESTABIL BASARABEAN
 Petru Cărare, poet, prozator, dramaturg, traducător
 Raportul Comisiei Cojocaru
 Petru Cărare omagiat în ziua de naștere

1935 births
2019 deaths
Romanian people of Moldovan descent
People from Căușeni District
Eastern Orthodox Christians from Romania
Moldova State University alumni
Moldovan writers
Moldovan male writers
Popular Front of Moldova politicians